"Hysterical" is a 2021 American documentary film, directed and produced by Andrea Blaugrund Nevins. It follows multiple comedians throughout their lives on stage and off. Judy Gold, Carmen Lynch, Kathy Griffin, Nikki Glaser, Jessica Kirson,  Marina Franklin, Bonnie McFarlane, Rachel Feinstein, Lisa Lampanelli, Kelly Bachman, Iliza Shlesinger, Fortune Feimster, Sherri Shepherd and Margaret Cho appear in the film.

It had its world premiere at South by Southwest on March 16, 2021. It was released on April 2, 2021, by FX.

Synopsis
The film follows multiple women comedians on stage, backstage, and off stage, exploring their hard-fought journey to become voices of their generation.

Cast
 Judy Gold
 Carmen Lynch
 Kathy Griffin
 Nikki Glaser
 Jessica Kirson
 Marina Franklin
 Bonnie McFarlane
 Rachel Feinstein
 Lisa Lampanelli
 Kelly Bachman
 Iliza Shlesinger
 Fortune Feimster
 Sherri Shepherd
 Margaret Cho
 Wendy Liebman
 Moms Mabley (archival footage)
 Phyllis Diller (archival footage)
 Joan Rivers (archival footage)
 Wanda Sykes (archival footage)
 Totie Fields (archival footage)
 Elayne Boosler (archival footage)
 Amy Schumer (archival footage)
 Chelsea Handler (archival footage)
 Ali Wong (archival footage)

Release
The film had its world premiere at South by Southwest on March 16, 2021. It was released in the United States on FX on April 2, 2021. It will have its international premiere at Hot Docs International Film Festival on April 29, 2021.

Reception
Hysterical holds an 88% approval rating on review aggregator website Rotten Tomatoes, based on 17 reviews, with a weighted average of 8.3/10. The website's critics consensus reads, "Hysterical may not probe systemic disadvantages as deeply as it could have, but it excels as a frank and sometimes joyous celebration of very funny women who have made their mark in an industry that often marginalizes their achievements." On Metacritic, the film holds a rating of 75 out of 100, based on 4 critics, indicating "generally favorable reviews".

References

External links
 
 
 
 

2021 films
2021 documentary films
American documentary films
Documentary films about comedy and comedians
Stand-up comedy concert films
FX Networks original films
2020s English-language films
2020s American films